Stoliczka is a genus of Pakistani nursery web spiders that was first described by Octavius Pickard-Cambridge in 1885.  it contains only two species, found only in Pakistan: S. affinis and S. insignis.

See also
 List of Pisauridae species

References

Araneomorphae genera
Pisauridae
Spiders of Asia
Taxa named by Octavius Pickard-Cambridge